Bhaudry Gildas Massouanga Moldakoldad (born September 8, 1982) is a footballer from Republic of the Congo who currently plays in Georgia for FC Olimpi Rustavi. He previously spent two years playing in Algeria.

References 
 

1982 births
Living people
Republic of the Congo footballers
Expatriate footballers in Gabon
NA Hussein Dey players
Expatriate footballers in Algeria
Expatriate footballers in Georgia (country)
Republic of the Congo expatriate footballers
Expatriate footballers in Morocco
Republic of the Congo expatriate sportspeople in Algeria
Moghreb Tétouan players
OMR El Annasser players
Association football forwards
Republic of the Congo international footballers